Antoni Valeri Ivanov (born 11 September 1995) is a Bulgarian footballer who plays as a midfielder for Liga I side FC Botoșani.

Career 
Ivanov started his professional career at Akademik Svishtov on loan from Ludogorets Razgrad.  In July 2014, he signed with Spartak Pleven where he won the 2014–15 North-West V AFG title.  In June 2016, Ivanov joined Sozopol but failed to establish himself in the starting XI and was released six months later.  In January 2017, after a successful trial period, Ivanov signed with Montana and made his First League debut on 12 February 2017 against Ludogorets Razgrad, coming on as substitute for Andreas Vasev.

In July 2017 he joined  Septemvri Sofia. He made his debut for the team on 17 July 2017 in match against Dunav Ruse.

Honours

Club
Spartak Pleven
V AFG: 2014–15

References

External links

Living people
1995 births
Footballers from Sofia
Bulgarian footballers
Association football midfielders
First Professional Football League (Bulgaria) players
Second Professional Football League (Bulgaria) players
PFC Ludogorets Razgrad players
PFC Akademik Svishtov players
PFC Spartak Pleven players
FC Sozopol players
FC Montana players
FC Septemvri Sofia players
Liga I players
CS Gaz Metan Mediaș players
CS Universitatea Craiova players
FC Dinamo București players
FC Botoșani players
Bulgarian expatriate footballers
Bulgarian expatriate sportspeople in Romania
Expatriate footballers in Romania